Whoppers are malted milk balls with an artificially flavored "chocolatey coating" produced by The Hershey Company. They are typically sold either in a small cardboard candy box, in a larger box that resembles a cardboard milk carton, the “Fun Size” variety which is a tube-shaped plastic package sealed at the sides, containing twelve Whoppers weighing 21 grams (0.75 oz), or the even smaller variety of a tube containing three Whoppers weighing 6.8 grams (0.23 oz).

History 
In 1939, the Overland Candy Company introduced the predecessor to Whoppers, a malted milk candy called "Giants". In 1947, Overland merged with Chicago Biscuit Company, Leaf Gum, and Laf Machinery. Two years later, Leaf Brands reintroduced malted milk balls under the name of "Whoppers". All products manufactured by Leaf Brands were purchased by W. R. Grace in the 1960s; however, they were repurchased by Leaf in 1976. Finally, Hershey Foods Corporation acquired the Leaf North America confectionery operations from Huhtamäki Oyj of Espoo, Finland, in 1996. The company has been producing the Whoppers candy to this day.

Whoppers were first sold unwrapped, two pieces for one cent. But after the creation of cellophane wrapping machines, smaller Whoppers were packaged and sold five for one cent, also known as Fivesomes. Leaf soon introduced the first confectionery milk carton package which would become a hallmark of the candy. Sometime between 1950 and 1952 an egg-shaped Whoppers candy called Mini Robin Eggs were introduced for Easter. They differ from the traditional Whoppers in being egg shaped and having a speckled candy shell.

In 2000, Hershey introduced Mini Whoppers. Traditionally chocolate in flavor, a new strawberry milkshake flavored variant became available in 2006. Soon after they also released Reese's Peanut Butter Cups flavored Whoppers (discontinued sometime between 2014 and 2015). For Easter 2009, three new milkshake flavors were released, which were vanilla, blueberry, and orange cream. The vanilla ones were reintroduced in 2016.

Ingredients 

Listed in decreasing order by weight: sugar, corn syrup, partially hydrogenated palm kernel oil, whey (milk), malted milk (barley malt, wheat flour, milk, salt, sodium bicarbonate), cocoa, 2% or less of: resinous glaze, sorbitan tristearate, soy lecithin, salt, natural and artificial flavors, calcium carbonate, tapioca dextrin.

Similar products
 Maltesers
 Milk Duds

References

External links

 

The Hershey Company brands
Products introduced in 1949
Candy
Kosher food
Brand name confectionery